Acrocercops barringtoniella is a moth of the family Gracillariidae, known from India and Java, Indonesia. The hostplants for the species include Barringtonia acutangula, Barringtonia spicata, Careya arborea, and Planchonia careya.

References

barringtoniella
Moths of Asia
Moths described in 1904